Ola Kolehmainen (born 1964) is a Finnish photographer.

Life and work
Born 1964 in Helsinki, Ola Kolehmainen graduated with a masters in photography at the Helsinki University of Art and Design in 1999. He studies and works in Berlin, Germany.

His work is concentrated on contemporary architecture, using interiors and buildings to create abstract compositions, with an interplay of light and reflection.

Solo exhibitions
2012
 Enlightenment, Alvar Aalto Museum, Jyväskylä, Finland
 Gallerie Brandstrup, Oslo, Norway
2010
 Alvar Aalto, Galeria Senda, Barcelona, Spain
 A Building Is Not a Building, KUNTSI, Museum of Modern Art, Vaasa, Finland
 Colour Urban Structures, Galerie Artfinder, Hamburg, Germany; Galerie Vanguardia, Bilbao, Spain; Galerie Brandstrup, Oslo, Norway
2009
 Ola Kolehmainen, The New Art Gallery Walsall, West Midlands, UK
 Ola Kolehmainen, Galleri Brandstrup, Oslo, Finland
 Ola Kolehmainen, Kiasma, Helsinki, Finland
2008
 Ola Kolehmainen, Galería SENDA, Barcelona, Spain

References

External links
 Gallery at the Christophe Guye Galerie
 Der Tagesspiegel, Ola Kolehmainen im Haus am Waldsee. Die Befreiung der Farbe, by Marcus Woeller, 6 April 2014.

Finnish photographers
1964 births
People from Helsinki
Living people